The following is an episode list for the Yo Gabba Gabba! television series. The series debuted on Nickelodeon on August 20, 2007, and its original run ended on November 12, 2015. In 2021, it was announced that Apple TV+ had ordered 20 new episodes for its streaming service.

Series overview

Episodes

Pilots: 2006

These pilots have not been broadcast.

Season 1: 2007–2008

All first-season episodes are written by Christian Jacobs and Scott Schultz.

Season 2: 2008–2011

Production of the second season was greenlit on December 18, 2007. Production started in March 2008 in Orange County, California.

Season 3: 2010–2011

The third season started production in September 2009 and began airing on Nickelodeon in 2010 with an order of 13 episodes. The season was later split in half, making a fourth season.

Season 4: 2011–2015

Season four was cleared for production in March 2011. A number of unreleased episodes have been referred to by online sources. Nick Jr's website hosted clips from a number of them as well. Four episodes were first broadcast in January 2015.

References

External links
 

Yo Gabba Gabba!
Yo Gabba Gabba!
Yo Gabba Gabba!